Egglestetton is a historic plantation house located near Chula, Amelia County, Virginia. It was built about 1799, and is a -story, five bay, frame dwelling with a gambrel roof. It has a Central-passage plan and has beaded weatherboard siding. The house was extensively restored in 1972–1973.  Also on the property is an early 19th-century kitchen. It was built for planter and Congressman Joseph Eggleston (1754-1811).

It was added to the National Register of Historic Places in 1980.

References

Plantation houses in Virginia
Houses on the National Register of Historic Places in Virginia
Houses completed in 1799
Houses in Amelia County, Virginia
National Register of Historic Places in Amelia County, Virginia